The Genting Sempah–Genting Highlands Highway is the main highway from Genting Sempah to Genting Highlands, Malaysia, a mountain resort and entertainment park. This is a private highway owned by Genting Berhad. The speed limit of the highway is 50 km/h (31 mph).

Route background
The Genting Sempah–Genting Highlands Highway begins at the downhill Genting Sempah near EXIT 803 on  Kuala Lumpur–Karak Expressway (kilometre 17.6). Its terminus (kilometre zero) is at Genting Highlands summit.

History
The Genting Sempah–Genting Highlands Highway used to be a private highway owned by Genting Highlands Resort. Construction of the access road to Genting Highlands began on 18 August 1965 and took four years to complete from Genting Sempah to Mount Ulu Kali's peak. The access road finally opened on 31 March 1969 in conjunction with the official laying of the foundation stone for the Genting Hotel (the then Highlands Hotel) by the then-Prime Minister Tunku Abdul Rahman Putra Al-Haj. In 2001, a new bypass Chin Swee Bypass was designed as a downhill route from the summit to the downhill Chin Swee Temple was constructed and completed in 2005. The construction of the new bypass was regarded as one of the most astonishing engineering projects in Malaysia. 

In 2021 and 2022, Genting Sempah was closed due to landslides caused by heavy rains that were exacerbated by climate change.

Notable events

 18 August 1965 – Construction of the access road to Genting Highlands began.
 31 March 1969 – The access road to Genting Highlands was opened.
 30 June 1995 – 20 people were killed in a landslide at the Genting Highlands slip road near the Kuala Lumpur–Karak Highway.
 16 July 1996 – A bus, ferrying a group of factory workers and their families on a holiday excursion, plunged into a 120-metre-deep ravine at km 1 near the Genting Highlands Resort, killing 17 of them. Six were children.
 5 June 2004 – A retired businessman was killed when the bus he was skidded overturned and crashed at km 16 near Sri Layang roundabout.
 31 March 2005 – A bus negotiating the sharp corner at km 18 at Gohtong Jaya roundabout skidded, hit the divider and landed on its side while coming down Genting Highlands. Fifteen passengers were injured.
 13 April 2006 – A landslide occurred at 11 p.m. at km 3.8. The landslide at the new Chin Swee Bypass to Genting Highlands two days ago caused soil and boulders to cover the road, making it inaccessible to traffic. No one was apparently hurt.
 22 September 2009 – Genting Malaysia Berhad has announced that soil erosion occurred at km 3.3 of a downhill road at the Genting Highlands Resort at 3.20 am. No one was apparently hurt.
 29 October 2010 – Seven people were killed and more than 20 injured when the bus they were travelling in crashed at the slip roads for the Kuala Lumpur–Karak Expressway near Genting Sempah.
 21 October 2011 – A man suffered light injuries when a landslide hit the front of his car at km 13.9 near Genting Highlands
 21 August 2013 – At least 37 people were killed and 16 others injured when the bus carrying 53 passengers crashed into ravine at Km 3.5 of the Genting Sempah–Genting Highlands Highway near Chin Swee Temple, Genting Highlands, Pahang. It was one of the worst road disasters in Malaysian history.
18 November 2014 – A landslide, caused by heavy rain, forced the closure of km 4.2 heading towards Genting Highlands.

Features

Dangerous curves
At least six spots along the 18 km road leading down from Genting Highlands have recorded horrific accident area involving buses and other heavy vehicles since 1989. 10% steep gradients, sharp bends and less-than-ideal road conditions can make it difficult for heavy vehicles to manoeuvre, and odds of losing control, skidding off the road and crashing, are high.

Separated one-way roads
The one-way road (formerly original dual-carriageway highway) from Chin Swee Temple was constructed as a climbing route to the summit. The other one-way road from the summit was designed as a downhill route to Chin Swee Temple.

Emergency escape ramp
Emergency escape ramps are also provided, especially on the one way downhill Genting Sempah bound lanes. An emergency escape ramp enables vehicles that are having braking problems to stop safely. It is typically a long, sand or gravel-filled lane adjacent to a road with a steep grade, and is designed to accommodate large, heavy vehicles. The deep gravel allows the heavy vehicle's momentum to be dissipated in a controlled and relatively harmless way, allowing the operator to stop it safely.

Viaducts at Chin Swee Bypass
Viaducts at the downhill road of Chin Swee Bypass leading Genting Sempah bound.

Le Tour de Langkawi
Genting Highlands serve as the finish point of a stage in the Tour de Langkawi cycling race. It is one of the longest (30 km) climbs featured in a cycling event.

Kilometre and Hectormetre markers 
Kilometer and Hectormetre markers are placed along the road. It can be used for reporting accident locations.

List of junctions

Original route

Genting Highlands Climbing Route
(Climbing route, One-way Genting Highlands bound)

Chin Swee Bypass
(Downhill route, One-way Genting Sempah bound)

References

Highways in Malaysia
Genting Highlands